Chatham Historic District is a national historic district located at Chatham, Pittsylvania County, Virginia.  The district includes 188 contributing buildings, 2 contributing sites, and 1 contributing object in the central business district of the town of Chatham. The district includes a variety of government, commercial, residential, religious and educational buildings and structures dating from the early-19th century to the mid-20th century. At the center of the district is the separately listed Pittsylvania County Courthouse.  Other notable buildings include the Judge Tredway House, Tunstall-Hargrave House, The Oaks (1832), Morea (1837), Hugh Weir House (1835), Planter's Bank, Thompson's Drug and Haberdashy Building, Corinth Christian Church, Emmanuel Episcopal Church (1881), Chatham Presbyterian Church (1886), Canada-Melton House (c. 1875), United States Post Office, Chatham High School, Chatham Elementary School (1925), Chatham Savings Bank, Masonic Temple (c. 1900), Collie Hotel/William Pitt Hotel (c. 1925), Beauty Plaza (c. 1950), and the Moses Building.  Also located in the district and separately listed are the Clerk's Office, Bill's Diner, and Burnett's Diner.

It was listed on the National Register of Historic Places in 2001.

References

Historic districts on the National Register of Historic Places in Virginia
Buildings and structures in Pittsylvania County, Virginia
National Register of Historic Places in Pittsylvania County, Virginia